Periklis Papapostolou (born 25 September 1975) is a retired professional football player who played as a midfielder.

He played in the Alpha Ethniki for Athinaikos and Ethnikos Asteras.

References

1975 births
Living people
Greek footballers
Athinaikos F.C. players
Panetolikos F.C. players
Nafpaktiakos Asteras F.C. players
Ethnikos Asteras F.C. players
A.O. Kerkyra players
Anagennisi Arta F.C. players
Diagoras F.C. players
Panachaiki F.C. players
Association football midfielders
Super League Greece players
Footballers from Trikala